The unnamed summit variously known as Peak 13762 or Silver King Peak lies within the Sawatch Range of the Colorado Rockies.  Its remoteness and the fact that it is surrounded by several 14,000 foot peaks means that it is rarely climbed.

Directions 
The Pine Creek Trailhead lies at 8,800 feet. From US 24, 6.3 miles south of the U.S.24-CO 82 intersection, turn onto Chaffee County 388. Continue straight at 0.3 miles and around a sharp turn at 0.6 miles where the road gets a bit rougher. Low clearance cars might want to park here, while others may continue up the last tenth of a mile to the trailhead. The trailhead lies on the boundary of the private Pine Creek Ranch.

See also

List of Colorado mountain ranges
List of Colorado mountain summits
List of Colorado fourteeners
List of Colorado 4000 meter prominent summits
List of the most prominent summits of Colorado
List of Colorado county high points

References

External links

Mountains of Colorado
Mountains of Chaffee County, Colorado
North American 4000 m summits
Great Divide of North America